The Timpanogos Storytelling Festival takes place Labor Day weekend at the end of each summer in Lehi, Utah. The festival draws a combined attendance of about 26,000 people each year, making it one of the largest storytelling festival in the United States. The festival typically lasts two days and invites professional storytellers from throughout the United States. In addition to daytime performances on Friday and Saturday, there are typically themed public performances in the evenings, such as Look Who's Talking, Bedtime Stories, My Favorite Stories, and Laughing' Night.

Festival origins 
In 1989, Karen Jackman Ashton, President of the Friends of the Orem Public Library, was looking for projects to promote community involvement in the Library. Ashton had been volunteering at the Library for years, presenting Storytime for preschoolers and helping with other Children's Library programs. When she saw an advertisement for a National Storytelling Festival in Tennessee, she decided to attend and gather more ideas for stories and programs for the Orem Library.

She went to the National Festival expecting to find ladies telling stories to children in a library. Instead, she found thousands of adults crowding into tents, listening to dynamic performers relating tales of history, culture, folk, and family life, as well as magical stories of “what if . . .!” The entire town of Jonesborough (population 3,000) had mobilized to accommodate the 10,000+ people who annually attend the three-day festival.

Ashton recognized in the storytelling festival the idea she was searching for. A festival brings people together and increases understanding by allowing them to communicate through stories. It fosters the simple, old community and family values—family members and neighbors talking with each other again, sharing family history and experiences. A storytelling festival is an active experience, not passive entertainment.

The Friends launched the first Timpanogos Storytelling Festival just eight months after Ashton presented the idea. The Ashton family opened their home to the community, set up performance areas on their property, and persuaded neighbors to do the same. Three Eastern storytellers of national fame and local talent including James Arrington, Marvin Payne, and Gaye Beeson performed for two days.

News of the Festival spread rapidly. By the second year, the Friends had expanded the hours of the Festival, planned an additional evening performance at the Scera Theater, borrowed another field for a fourth performance tent, and invited school groups to the Friday morning performances. Five of the best storytellers in the nation were on the program, and auditions had been held to determine the successful regional tellers. Acoustic musicians performed during the intermissions throughout the day, supplementing performances by storytellers on the fiddle, banjo, harmonica, and spoons.

Expansion and growth 
The Timpanogos Storytelling Festival has grown each year—in both audience size and prestige. Attendance at annual Festival events total 26,000 and the Festival is recognized throughout the national storytelling world as a standard setter. The Festival and its organizers have received national media attention and awards. Storytelling event organizers from around the nation attend the Timpanogos Festival for training. The Timpanogos Storytelling Festival has garnered this reputation not only because of the great talent featured, but also because of the scenic setting, the terrific audience, the extraordinary community support, and its excellence in organization.

In 1999, the National Storytelling Network honored Ashton with the Leadership Award in recognition of her exemplary leadership and significant contributions to the community through storytelling. In the same year, the Utah Storytelling Guild (spawned by the Festival and now supporting the Festival) received the National Storytelling Network Service Award. Janet Low, Festival Coordinator, was awarded the Service Award in 2000 and Debi Richan, Festival Vice-President, received this national award in 2004. 

In 2005, the Festival opened at the new Mt. Timpanogos Park in Provo Canyon.  Designed by the City of Orem for the annual Festival, the park allows Festival growth to continue with more and larger performance tents.

The Timpanogos Festival is not a small event. It requires significant donations from businesses and foundations and thousands of volunteer hours from individuals and community groups such as the American Legion, Kiwanis, Golden Kiwanis, youth groups, student clubs, the Boy Scouts and Girl Scouts, and the Utah Storytelling Guild. Ashton commented, "If just one family leaves the Festival and begins to share stories with each other, it will be worth it."

In 2017 the festival moved locations to Thanksgiving Point's Ashton Gardens. A virtual festival was held in 2020 because of the COVID-19 pandemic. The 33rd festival will take place on 8-10 September 2022.

References

External links
 Timpanogos Storytelling Festival Official Website

Festivals in Utah
Tourist attractions in Utah County, Utah
Recurring events established in 1989
Orem, Utah
1989 establishments in Utah
Festivals established in 1989
Storytelling festivals